"Crickets Sing for Anamaria" is the English-language version of "Os Grilos" ("The Crickets"), a song written by Brazilian musician Marcos Valle with his brother Paulo Sérgio Valle.

Original version
The instrumental original of "Os Grilos" appeared on Valle's 1967 album Brazilliance! and became a "breakout hit". The English version, to which producer Ray Gilbert contributed the lyrics, appeared on Valle's 1968 album Samba '68 and on Astrud Gilberto's 1968 album Windy. It has been covered many times since. The Anamaria of the title was Valle's then-wife, who also sang on Samba '68.

Among the covers, there is the one of the Brazilian pianist and arranger Eumir Deodato who played as sideman with Marcos Valle, as well as Aretha Franklin, Luis Bonfá, Antonio Carlos Jobim among others. 
His LP on which there is "Os Grilos" cover is Os Catedráticos/Ataque.

Emma Bunton version

English singer Emma Bunton covered "Crickets Sing for Anamaria" her second solo studio album, Free Me (2004). It was released on 31 May 2004 as the album's fourth and final single. "Crickets" debuted and peaked at number 15 on the UK Singles Chart, Bunton's second single to miss the top 10 in UK, after "We're Not Gonna Sleep Tonight". It is also Bunton's comeback to the Irish Top 40 after failing with "I'll Be There". The music video for the song was directed by Harvey & Carolyn, who also worked with Bunton on the video for "Maybe". Jake Canuso, of Benidorm, co-starred in the music video as the love interest. For the B-sides, Bunton covered Paul Anka's "Eso Beso" and Valle's "So Nice (Summer Samba)". The only original B-side was the Latino version of "Maybe".

Track listings
UK CD 1
"Crickets Sing for Anamaria" – 2:46
"Maybe"  – 3:54

UK CD 2
"Crickets Sing for Anamaria" – 2:46
"Eso Beso" – 3:14
"So Nice (Summer Samba)" – 3:11
"Crickets Sing for Anamaria"  – 4:13

Credits and personnel
Credits adapted from the liner notes of Free Me.

 Emma Bunton – vocals
 Danny Cummings – percussion
 Richard Dowling – mastering
 Peter Gordeno – keyboards
 Martin Hayles – recording
 Graham Kearns – bass guitar
 Mike Peden – keyboards, production
 Frank Ricotti – vibes
 Charlie Russell – programming
 Phil Todd – flute
 Paul Turner – guitar

Charts

Release history

References

19 Recordings singles
1968 songs
2004 singles
Bossa nova songs
Emma Bunton songs
English-language Brazilian songs
Polydor Records singles
Songs with lyrics by Ray Gilbert
Songs with music by Marcos Valle